Endre Puky de Bizák (20 February 1871 – 20 July 1941) was a Hungarian politician, who served as Minister of Foreign Affairs between 1932 and 1933.

References
 Magyar Életrajzi Lexikon

External links
 

1871 births
1941 deaths
Politicians from Košice
Foreign ministers of Hungary